Brass buttons may refer to:

 A Yorkshire idiom, meaning someone has no money, i.e. "And pay with what? Brass buttons"?
 Cotula coronopifolia, a small marsh flower
 A Brass Button, a 1911 American film 
 Brass Buttons, a 1919 American comedy film directed by Henry King
 "Brass Buttons", a song by Gram Parsons from the album Grievous Angel